Jim Crow Creek is a stream and a road east of Downieville in Sierra County, California, in the United States.

Jim Crow Creek was named after the nickname of a Kanaka (Pacific Island worker) in the California Gold Rush.

See also
List of rivers of California

References

Rivers of Sierra County, California
Rivers of Northern California